San Martín is a simple station, part of the TransMilenio mass-transit system of Bogotá, Colombia.

Location

The station is located in northwestern Bogotá, specifically on Avenida Suba with Calle 83.

History

In 2006, phase two of the TransMilenio system was completed, including the Avenida Suba line, on which this station is located.

The station is named San Martín for the neighborhood of the same name located to the east of the station.

Station services

Main line service

Feeder routes

This station does not have connections to feeder routes.

Inter-city service

This station does not have inter-city service.

See also
List of TransMilenio Stations

TransMilenio